Jp Ganga Path (Ganga Pathway) or  Patna Marine Drive is an expressway along the Ganga river in Patna, Bihar, India. It is expected to be completed by the end of 2022. It is being jointly constructed by the Housing and Urban Development Corporation (HUDCO) and the Government of Bihar.

The first phase of the expressway was open to the public on 24 June 2022.

History
It was approved in August 2007 and the ground breaking ceremony was held on 11 October 2013 by the Chief Minister of Bihar, Nitish Kumar. On 24 June 2022, the first phase of the expressway expressway was inaugurated by Bihar Chief Minister Nitish Kumar.

The Expressway
It is a  road built between Digha and Deedarganj in Patna at a cost of Rs.2234.46 crores. The second phase extends the road by 18 km to Fatuha. The Ganga Path is 6.5 km at-grade level and 14 km elevated.

Ganga Path project which has been in pipeline for many years, dubbed as the Marine Drive of Patna, the Ganga Path or Ganga Expressway will connect Digha to Kacchi Dargah along the river Ganges. The tender for the same is likely to be issued by the second week of May by Bihar State Road Development Corporation and the contract will be finalized by June.

Cost
The total cost involved in this mega project is 5600 crore, having time interval for its completion to be four years. After the private investors failed to appear on the horizon, the State government itself decided to go ahead with the project. The Cabinet has given approval to take loan of 2000 crore from Housing and Urban Development Corporation (HUDCO) and the rest amount of 1,160 crore is to be raised through the State resources. HUDCO has agreed to provide the loan at a floating interest rate of 10.75%, to be returned in 16 years after completion of the project. Out of the total budget, a sum of 2,770 crore will be spent on the construction of road and elevation work and 390 crore on land acquisition and utility shifting.

Decongest Patna
The expressway will ensure a smooth flow of traffic between east to west Patna, and also ease the traffic congestion at Ashok Rajpath. There will be nine points on the expressway connected to Ashok Rajpath. It will be a toll road. The much-anticipated project will give breath to the heavily congested roads of east to west Patna. It will not only give a beautiful riverfront but will also give a boost to the economic activities of the area.

Features at a glance
Total length : 23.04 km
Drive way : 4-Lane, 14 m;km
Drive way on land : 16 km
Footpath : 5-foot on either side of drive way
Connection to bridges: Digha Rail bridge, Mahatma Gandhi Setu, Kacchi Dargah-Bidupur Bridge
Total cost : 3,106 Crore

Patna Riverfront
It is planned as 4.5 km long riverfront along Ganges. 20 ghats were to be developed along a 2.3-km promenade with four cultural centres on the stretch of Patna riverfront. 4.5-metre wide esplanade has to stretch from  Collectorate Ghat to Adalat Ghat (470m), Adalat Ghat to Gandhi Ghat (1132mt), Gandhi Ghat to Rani Ghat (384m) and — after a gap of few ghats — Bhadra Ghat to Nauzar Ghat (330m).  This project is part of National Ganga River Basin Authority.

Status updates 
 Aug 2017: 14 ghats have been completed.
 June 2022 the first phase of the expressway expressway was inaugurated by Bihar Chief Minister Nitish Kumar on 24 June.

See also
 Marine Drive, Mumbai
 Outer Ring Road, Patna
 Thames Path
 Ganga Expressway
 Patna–Digha Ghat line

References

Transport in Patna
Memorials to Jayaprakash Narayan